Petersius conserialis is a species of fish in the family Alestidae, and the sole member of the genus Petersius. It is endemic to Tanzania.  Its natural habitat is rivers.

References

Alestidae
Freshwater fish of Tanzania
Endemic fauna of Tanzania
Taxa named by Franz Martin Hilgendorf
Fish described in 1894
Taxonomy articles created by Polbot